Crumlin railway station served Crumlin in County Antrim, Northern Ireland but is now closed to passengers.

The station was built for the Dublin and Antrim Junction Railway and opened on 13 November 1871. Translink withdrew passenger services from the line when it reopened the more direct  –  route via . Translink stated that it was unable to maintain two routes to Antrim and after operating a skeleton service on the route announced that it would be mothballed.

Northern Ireland Railways removed the passing loop here to make the line one long siding.

References

Disused railway stations in County Antrim
Railway stations opened in 1871
Railway stations closed in 2003
1871 establishments in Ireland
2003 disestablishments in Northern Ireland
Railway stations in Northern Ireland opened in the 19th century